The 2009 webcomic Homestuck, written and drawn by Andrew Hussie, currently holds a soundtrack consisting of 30 digital albums. Besides static images, Homestuck makes use of flash animations and games, which often involve background music. The music of Homestuck is composed by fans, but is published by Hussie through his Bandcamp page under the What Pumpkin record label. Hussie established a small "Music Contribution Team" for the webcomic, which is coordinated by Toby Fox.

Production 

The first piece of music ever featured on MS Paint Adventures was a fan-made title theme for Problem Sleuth, created by later-Slender: The Eight Pages-developer Mark J. Hadley. While starting Homestuck, Andrew Hussie posted an open invitation for composers on the MS Paint Adventures forums. Clark Powell, the creator of the "Homestuck Anthem", responded to this call, becoming a member of the "Music Contribution Team". Jeremy "Solatrus" Iamurri's work on Homestucks music gave him the exposure needed to become a professional musician.

After he posted various piano covers on a Homestuck fan forum, Hussie reached out to Toby Fox – who later went on to create the video game Undertale – to produce music for the webcomic's flash animations. The piece "Megalovania", which Fox initially composed for an EarthBound ROM hack titled The Halloween Hack in 2008, was used in Homestuck as well as Undertale. Fox recounts that he set a goal for himself to get his music featured in the webcomic, predicting the direction the story would take and sending in music that would be relevant in the predicted situations. In an interview with Polygon, Fox said that "Over time I kind of established that I 'get' what [Hussie] wants pretty well," which eventually led him to the role of production coordinator for music.

Hussie wrote on his Tumblr blog that he never gives artists or musicians context when requesting input, keeping his requests vague by only suggesting a change in tempo or the inclusion of a leitmotif. According to Fox, Hussie creates animations in Homestuck based on the music he receives rather than the other way around. He described this as the most rewarding aspect of creating music for the webcomic: "seeing what visuals he creates to go with the audio after imagining your own."

The music of Homestuck is published through Hussie's own record label "What Pumpkin". With the music released on Bandcamp, payment is split between Hussie and the album creators. As the popularity of Homestuck rose, more fans requested to be on the Music Contribution Team; however, Hussie chose to keep the team a fixed size, and closed it to new members. Only team members are legally allowed to profit from Homestuck-related commissions.

Fans of Homestuck have created a large amount of filk music based on the webcomic and its soundtrack. Aja Romano of The Huffington Post stated that Homestuck filk music is frequently paired with "skilled video editing," producing "wondrous results."

Reception 

Adam Harper of The Fader has described the music of Homestuck as "subtly evad[ing] genre, skipping through all kinds of sound worlds, seemingly guided more by emotion ... than form." He pointed at One Year Older and Song of Skaia as oddly mesmerizing albums. Furthermore, Harper described the digitally painted album artwork as "bizarre" and praised What Pumpkin's "weirdly great-looking" Bandcamp page.

Reid Gacke of Only Single Player rated Toby Fox' "Megalovania" as one of the best video game songs in 2015, noting that it was initially part of the Homestuck soundtrack before being remastered for Undertale. Gacke has also noted that Homestuck has "better video game music than many video games."

Discography 
30 albums were released on Bandcamp through the What Pumpkin record label, aggregating to 603 total tracks.

Notes

References 

Webcomic soundtracks
MS Paint Adventures